A translation project is a project that deals with the activity of translating.

From a technical point of view, a translation project is closely related to the project management of the translation process. But, from an intercultural point of view, a translation project is much more complex; this becomes evident, for instance, when considering Bible translation or other literary translation projects.

Translation scholars such as Antoine Berman defend the views that every translator shall develop their own translation project, adhere to it and, later, develop translation criticism. Every translator can only be faithful to their own translation project.

See also
Cultural translation
Skopos theory
Translation
Translation studies
Translation criticism
Literary translation
Untranslatability

Bibliography

References

Translation
Translation studies
Projects